Lankalakoderu is a village in West Godavari District, india. It is exactly 4 km away from Palakol. Lankalakoderu (LKDU) has its own railway station connecting major cities.

Government and politics
Lankalakoderu  gram panchayat is the local self-government of the village. The elected members of the gram panchayat is headed by a sarpanch. The sarpanch of the villages was awarded Nirmala Grama Puraskaram for the year 2013.

Demographics 
 Census of India, Lankalakoderu had a population of 6759. The total population constitutes 3344 males and 3415 females with a sex ratio of 1021 females per 1000 males. 573 children are in the age group of 0–6 years, with sex ratio of 976. The average literacy rate stands at 79.60%.

References

Villages in West Godavari district